Atagema osseosa is a species of sea slug or dorid nudibranch, a marine gastropod mollusk in the family Discodorididae.

Distribution
This species is found in the tropical Indo-West Pacific Ocean, with records at least from the coasts of India and eastern Australia.

Description
This nudibranch has evolved to mimic closely in appearance the sandy-coloured sponge on which it both lives and feeds off.

Ecology
Like many nudibranchs, this species feeds on sponges.

References

Discodorididae
Molluscs of the Indian Ocean
Molluscs of the Pacific Ocean
Gastropods described in 1859
Taxa named by Edward Frederick Kelaart